H2O is a free and open-source web server software.

It is written in C, and is distributed under the terms of the MIT License.

Overview 
It is designed on the presence of HTTP/2 and TLS, and maximizing the use of HTTP/2 technologies such as prioritization and server push, it achieves significantly better performance than conventional web server software such as nginx.

Features 
H2O has the following key features:
 HTTP/1.0 and HTTP/1.1 support
 HTTP/2 support
 Full support for dependency and weight-based prioritization with server-side tweaks
 Cache-aware server push
 HTTP/3 support (experimental)
 TCP Fast Open
 TLS support
 Session resumption (standalone and memcached)
 Session tickets with automatic key rollover
 Automatic OCSP stapling
 Forward secrecy and fast AEAD cipher suite
 Private key protection using privilege separation
 Static file serving
 FastCGI support
 Reverse proxy
 Scripting by mruby (Rack-based)
 Graceful restart and self-upgrade

History 
In ,  started the development H2O as a mobile game server inside DeNA.

See also 

 Fastly - The largest user of H2O in the world.

References

External links 
 
 

Free web server software
DeNA
Free software programmed in C
Software using the MIT license
2015 software
Reverse proxy
Unix network-related software
Web server software for Linux